Lawrence Kwoh (born 21 April 1960) is a Hong Kong former swimmer. He competed in two events at the 1976 Summer Olympics.

References

External links
 

1960 births
Living people
Hong Kong male breaststroke swimmers
Olympic swimmers of Hong Kong
Swimmers at the 1976 Summer Olympics
Place of birth missing (living people)